Jocelyn Edna Parr (born 5 March 1967) is a former New Zealand association football player who represented her country.

Parr made her Football Ferns debut in a 0–0 draw with Australia on 10 October 1991 and ended her international career with 4 caps to her credit.

Parr represented New Zealand at the Women's World Cup finals in China in 1991 playing one group game, a 0–3 loss to Denmark.

References

External links

1967 births
Living people
New Zealand women's international footballers
New Zealand women's association footballers
1991 FIFA Women's World Cup players
Women's association football defenders